The Northeast Arizona Technological Institute of Vocational Education (NATIVE) is a joint technological education district in the Arizona portion of the Navajo Nation reservation. Its programs are available to students at the member schools. The superintendent is Matthew Weber.

Member schools
Chinle High School
Ganado High School
Monument Valley High School
Pinon High School
Red Mesa High School
Valley High School (Apache County, Arizona)
Tuba City High School
Window Rock High School

References
Arizona Department of Education records

External links

School districts in Arizona